Lira Airport  is an airport serving Lira, a town in the Lira District of Uganda. Lira Airport is one of twelve upcountry airports that are administered by the Civil Aviation Authority of Uganda. It is also one of the 46 airports in the country.

Location

See also
 Transport in Uganda
 List of airports in Uganda
 Lango sub-region

References

External links
OpenStreetMap - Lira
OurAirports - Lira
Lira Airport

Airports in Uganda
Lira District